Luitfriedia is a monospecific genus of solenogasters, shell-less, worm-like, marinemollusks.
This genus, and the sole species, Luitfriedia minuta, occurs in Galicia, Spain.

The genus was named in honor of the malacologist Luitfried von Salvini-Plawen.

Description
This solenogaster bears a range of differently-shaped spicules. It lacks a radula, and bears ten to twelve "respiratory folds".

References

Cavibelonia
Monotypic mollusc genera